William Lobban-Bean (born September 30, 1983), also known as Cook Classics, is an American music producer, songwriter and engineer. He is currently based in Los Angeles.

Discography

Singles

Full discography

References

Record producers from California
Living people
People from Los Angeles
1983 births